Krystyna  Krupska-Wysocka (19 September 1935 – 9 June 2020) was a Polish film director. In 2011 she was awarded the Order of Polonia Restituta.

Krupska-Wysocka was active in the Solidarity Trade Union, when she organized help with friends for the opposition and the film community. She was friends with the Rev. Stefan Niedzielak, a Catholic priest and chaplain who co-founded the Federation of Katyn Families, and who was assassinated in 1989 by "unknown perpetrators".

She was a member of the Polish Filmmakers Association. In 2011, Polish President Bronisław Komorowski awarded her the Officer's Cross of the Order of Polonia Restituta. 1988 and 1994, she received awards at the Polish National Festival of Films for Television Shows for Children and Youth.
 
Krystyna Krupska-Wysocka died in Warsaw on 9 June 2020, aged 84.

Filmography
 1970:  (second director)
 1970:  (cast)
 1971:  (second director)
 1971:  (second director)
 1972: Skarb Trzech Łotrów (second director)
 1973:  (second director)
 1977:  (second director)
 1979: Sekret Enigmy (second director)
 1979:  (second director)
 1985:  (director, scriptwriter)
 1989:  (second director)
 1991:  (cast)
 1993:  (director, scriptwriter)
 1994: Ptaszka (director)

References

1935 births
2020 deaths
Place of birth missing
Polish film directors
Polish women film directors
Officers of the Order of Polonia Restituta